Sarah Michelle Ryan, OAM (born 20 February 1977) is an Australian former sprint freestyle swimmer, who won relay medals at three consecutive Olympics from the 1996 Summer Olympics to the 2004 Summer Olympics.

Career

Coming from Adelaide, South Australia, Ryan attended the Catholic Mount Carmel College, before moving to the Australian Institute of Sport, Canberra, in 1993 after being awarded a scholarship.  She gained selection for Australia the following year at the 1994 Commonwealth Games in Victoria, British Columbia.

In 1996, in Atlanta, she came sixth in the 100-metre freestyle, and was a member of the 4×100-metre medley relay along with Susie O'Neill, Samantha Riley and Nicole Stevenson, which claimed silver behind the United States team.  At the 1998 Commonwealth Games in Kuala Lumpur, Malaysia, she was a part of the team which won the 4×100-metre freestyle relay only days after the death of her father.

In 2000, in Sydney, Ryan failed to qualify for the finals of either the 50- or 100-metre freestyle.  She was a member of the 4×100-metre freestyle relay which placed sixth and collected a silver for swimming in the heats of the 4×100-metre medley relay, being replaced by O'Neill in the final, again second to the Americans.

In 2001, possibly her most savoured moment came at the FINA World Championships in Fukuoka, Japan, when she anchored the 4×100-metre medley relay team with Dyana Calub, Leisel Jones and Petria Thomas to a long-awaited win over the American team.  It was the first time that Australia had defeated the Americans at either Olympic or World level in the event.  The year 2002 broke another drought, with Ryan being part of a 4×100-metre freestyle team alongside Jodie Henry, Alice Mills and Thomas, which defeated the Americans for the first time since 1956.

In 2003, Ryan took time away from swimming and commenced a job as a breakfast radio presenter, as well as an occasional swimming analyst on SBS' Toyota World Sports and Channel Nine's Wide World of Sports.  However, with Australia's young sprinting talent on the rise, she made a comeback to qualify for the 4×100-metre freestyle relay team for the 2004 Summer Olympics in Athens.  Ryan swam in the heats, but was replaced in the final by Thomas, who combined with Henry, Mills and Libby Lenton to claim gold in a world record time of 3min 35.94 seconds.  Ryan retired after the games.

In 2006, to support multiple sclerosis research, Ryan teamed up with 2003 Australian Idol winner and award-winning recording artist Guy Sebastian in 7 Network's It Takes Two, in which famous accomplished Australians from their different fields, and not known to be singers, performed duets with professional vocalists to support their chosen charity.  Ryan and Sebastian were the last team to be eliminated, making them the runners-up in the competition.

She was an Australian Institute of Sport scholarship holder.

As of May 2009 Sarah Ryan started working for the YMCA of Sydney at Mount Annan Leisure Centre as a Learn-to-swim teacher and swim coach.

Sarah now works for Mater Dei, an organization that provides early intervention therapy services and education for babies, children and young people with an intellectual disability or developmental delay.

See also
 List of Olympic medalists in swimming (women)

References

External links
 

1977 births
Living people
Sportswomen from South Australia
Olympic swimmers of Australia
Swimmers at the 1996 Summer Olympics
Swimmers at the 2000 Summer Olympics
Swimmers at the 2004 Summer Olympics
Olympic gold medalists for Australia
Olympic silver medalists for Australia
Swimming commentators
Commonwealth Games silver medallists for Australia
Australian Institute of Sport swimmers
Commonwealth Games gold medallists for Australia
Australian female freestyle swimmers
World Aquatics Championships medalists in swimming
Recipients of the Medal of the Order of Australia
Medalists at the FINA World Swimming Championships (25 m)
Medalists at the 2004 Summer Olympics
Sportspeople from Adelaide
Medalists at the 2000 Summer Olympics
Medalists at the 1996 Summer Olympics
Olympic gold medalists in swimming
Olympic silver medalists in swimming
Commonwealth Games medallists in swimming
Swimmers at the 1994 Commonwealth Games
Swimmers at the 1998 Commonwealth Games
Swimmers at the 2002 Commonwealth Games
Medallists at the 1994 Commonwealth Games
Medallists at the 1998 Commonwealth Games
Medallists at the 2002 Commonwealth Games